Vehicle registration plates of the Mercosur are a system under implementation in the Mercosur member states, regional bloc and intergovernmental organization founded in 1991.

History
During a meeting held in Foz do Iguaçu, Brazil, on December 15, 2010, a resolution was approved to unify the plate models of the then four countries belonging to the bloc: Argentina, Brazil, Paraguay and Uruguay. The initial planning foresaw implementation in up to 10 years, initially from 2016 for vehicles of load and of passengers that circulated beyond the borders.

At a followup meeting held in Buenos Aires on October 8, 2014, the representatives of the five member countries of the bloc (the four founders plus Venezuela) were presented the Mercosur slabs model, which was expected to start in 2016. Ultimately, the plan was delayed. The new plates are expected to come into effect in September 2018.

It is expected that the measure will reach a fleet of 110 million vehicles in the five countries and aims to facilitate traffic and road safety among the member countries of the bloc, as well as ensure the existence of a joint database.

List
Vehicle registration plates of each Mercosur country are described in the following table:

See also
 Vehicle registration plates of Honduras
 Vehicle registration plates of Guatemala
 List of international vehicle registration codes

References

External links
Resolução 510/2014 do DENATRAN - Brazil - which specifies the Mercosul trade marks in the country 
DNRPA page - Argentina - about the presentation of the plates of the Mercosur standard 

Vehicle registration plates
Transport and the Mercosur